"9 Shots" is a song by American hip hop recording artist 50 Cent, released on August 14, 2015 as a non-album single. The song was produced by Frank Dukes.

Music video 
A music video for the song was directed by Eif Rivera. and it contains guest appearances by G-Unit mates Tony Yayo and Lloyd Banks. It premiered after the season two finale of the 50-Cent-produced series Power.

Background 
50 Cent debuted a new single titled “9 Shots” produced by Frank Dukes at a Capitol Records event in NYC on Wednesday. 50 mentioned it is a metaphor between 9 moments of life and him being shot 9 times when he was starting his music career. The song was officially released the day after the live premiere.

Charts

References

External links

2015 singles
50 Cent songs
Songs written by 50 Cent
Capitol Records singles
2015 songs
G-Unit Records singles